Sadarangani is a surname. Notable people with the surname include:

 Abhinav Sadarangani (born 1994), Indian cricketer
 Sharanya Sadarangani (born 1995), Indian cricketer

Indian surnames